Malabar Migration refers to the large-scale migration of Saint Thomas Christians who existed in Southern and Central Kerala for most of its history to Northern Kerala (Malabar) in the 20th century.

History
The migration started from early decades of the 20th century and continued well into the 1970s and 1980s. The first organized migration to Malabar was envisaged by the Knanaya Catholic Diocese of Kottayam under the direction of the then Bishop Mar Alexander Chulaparambil in 1943. Two settlements or colonies were started. The first was the Rajapuram Colony in the present Kasargod District. A group of 72 selected families from Kidangoor, Koodalloor, Punnathura and Pala came by train to Kanjangad and proceeded to their destinations at Chullikara, Kallar and Malakkallu. The second settlement was in Madampam, 30 Kilometers East of Kannur. 100 families mostly from Meenachil Taluk traveled by train to Kannur and settled at Madampam and Payyavoor. The settlement was named after the bishop, Alexnagar colony, in the present Kannur District. The idea of organized migration was envisaged and presented to the Bishop by Professor Joseph Kandoth, who was then a professor at the St. Alosius College in Manglore. This migration had a significant demographic and social impact as the Christian population of Malabar increased 15-fold from 31,191 in 1931 to 442,510 in 1971.

Central Travancore had experienced a steep increase in population in the early 20th century and pressure on arable land increased. At the same time people realized the potential in the large uncultivated lands in the northern regions called Malabar which was then part of Madras Province under British Rule. Migration initially started in trickles. Land was bought from the local rulers and plantations were set up. Against many odds, the community thrived, thereby attracting more migrants and by the 1950s had reached its peak.

Communities that migrated
The vast majority of the migrants were Syrian Christians, mainly (Syrian Malabar Nasrani) from erstwhile Travancore state. The migrants were mostly from present day Kottayam such as Pala, Chaganacherry, Kanjirapally, Kuravillagadu, Ramapuram, Bharananganam etc. and Idukki districts (Thodupuzha Taluk) with many from hill areas of Ernakulam district also, like Kothamangalam, Moovattupuzha etc. Settlements were established in various hill areas of Malabar region (north Kerala) including in the following districts of current Kerala (Some key migration centres also mentioned):

 Kasargod - Rajapuram, Kolichal, Panathady, Panathur, Malakkallu, Malom, Chittarikkal, Balal, Vellarikund
 Kannur - Alakode, Manakadavu, Udayagiri, Madampam, Payyavoor, Chemperi, Chempanthotty, Cherupuzha, Kudianmala, Iritty, Ulikkal, Manikkadavu, Peravoor, Kanichar, Kelakam
 Calicut - Thiruvambady , Kodenchery Kuttiyadi , Maruthonkara, Koorachundu, Thottumukkam.
 Wayanad - Perikkallur, Thettamala, Pulpally, Mananthavady, Nadavayal
 Malappuram - Nilambur Taluk (Nilambur and its surrounding places)
 Palakkad - Mannarkkad, Vadakkenchery
 Thrissur - especially in the hill tracts near Vellikulangara

Huge tracts of uncultivated forest and waste land were converted into farms and plantations during this period.

The supportive role of Syro-Malabar Catholic Church is well acknowledged as they supported this young community with churches, schools, hospitals and other infrastructure.

The migration has resulted in hundreds of thousands of people moving to these lands. As a result, the demography of Malabar has been altered significantly especially in the eastern hill region. The share of Christians which was insignificant in the 1920s grew to substantial share by the 1970s in the settlement area.

See also
 Archeparchy of Thalassery
 Eparchy of Mananthavady
 List of Syrian Malabar Nasranis
 Syrian church in India
 Saint Thomas Christians

References

 Malabar Migration. There was a second immigration. It was into the North Malabar Region in search of virgin land to cultivate and to get relief from the poverty and financial ...

External links
 http://www.thehindu.com/todays-paper/tp-features/tp-editorialfeatures/breaking-into-the-big-league/article2843471.ece
 https://web.archive.org/web/20110708112119/http://www.calicutdiocese.com/history.doc
 https://web.archive.org/web/20110721075644/http://www.kottayamad.org/malabar_migration.htm
 https://web.archive.org/web/20100504221920/http://www.iritty.com/articles.html

Social history of Kerala
Internal migrations in India
Malabar Coast